Yirrkala omanensis also known as the Oman snake eel is an eel in the family Ophichthidae (worm/snake eels). It was described by John Roxborough Norman in 1939, originally under the genus Sphagebranchus. It is a marine, tropical eel which is known from the Gulf of Oman (from which its species epithet and common name are derived), in the western Indian Ocean.

References

Ophichthidae
Fish described in 1939